The Cheltenham by-election was a Parliamentary by-election held on 28 April 1911. It returned one Member of Parliament (MP)  to the House of Commons of the Parliament of the United Kingdom, elected by the first past the post voting system.

Previous result

Result

Aftermath
A General Election was due to take place by the end of 1915. By the autumn of 1914, the following candidates had been adopted to contest that election. Due to the outbreak of war, the election never took place.

 Agg-Gardner was officially supported by the Coalition Government.

References

 Craig, F. W. S. (1974). British parliamentary election results 1885-1918 (1 ed.). London: Macmillan. 
 Debrett's House of Commons 1916

1911 in England
1911 elections in the United Kingdom
By-elections to the Parliament of the United Kingdom in Gloucestershire constituencies
Politics of Cheltenham
20th century in Gloucestershire